Umberto Rapetto (born in Acqui Terme on 19 August 1959) is an Italian general of the Guardia di Finanza, on leave since 2012, and former commander of the Online Fraud Special Group.

In Telecom Italia after being strategic advisor to the executive chairman, Franco Bernabè, and then - as group senior vice president - director of initiatives and special projects, he left at the end of 2013 in disagreement with the choices of the new top management.

From 2013 to 2015 he hosted the RAI TV show Il Verificatore and in February 2020 he founded the magazine Infosec.news, of which he is the editorial director.

Biography 
A former cadet of Nunziatella Military School, as Head of the Technological Crime Group, that he founded and led, in 2001 he directed the investigations that led to the definitive conviction of computer crackers involved in web attacks against the Pentagon and NASA, as well as those delegated by the Italian Court of Audit on the scandal of slot machines not connected to the tax registry, an investigation that led to the conviction of the heads of the State Monopolies and the concessionary companies to pay 2.5 billion euros.

On May 29, 2012, following his removal from office, he resigned from the Guardia di Finanza. His removal is the subject of nine parliamentary pleas.

As an advisor to Marco Pantani's family, he testified on April 16, 2019 before the Anti-Mafia Parliamentary Commission.

Activity

University lecturing 
He has carried out university teaching activities in several universities, including the University of Rome Tor Vergata, Pisa, Calabria, Roma Tre, Trento, Chieti/Pescara, Cattolica del Sacro Cuore in Piacenza, Teramo, Link Campus University, "LUM - Jean Monnet" in Bari, Parma, Palermo, Macerata, La Sapienza in Rome.

Teaching 
Speaker and chairman in national and international conferences on economic and technological crime, in the institutional field he teaches and has taught at the Training Schools of intelligence structures, the Directorate of Electronic and Computer Courses of the Defense Staff, the Italian War School, the Center for Advanced Defense Studies, the Higher Institute of Interforce Major States ISSMI, the Technical School of the Italian State Police, the Higher Institute of Police and many other schools and training institutions for state officers.

He has lectured in several academic institutions including the School of Specialization in Law and Economics of the EC University La Sapienza of Rome, the School of Management of LUISS ("Risk & crisis management"), the Faculty of Engineering of the University La Sapienza of Rome, the Faculty of Architecture "Valle Giulia" of the University La Sapienza of Rome, the Faculty of Political Science "Cesare Alfieri" of the University of Florence.

Publishing activity 
Member since 1990 to the Italian Order of Journalists, has written over two thousand articles on the pages of major national newspapers. He has collaborated with the newspapers Il Messaggero, Italia Oggi, MF Milano Finanza, Il Giornale, L'Indipendente, Il Giorno, La Nazione, Il Resto del Carlino. La Gazzetta del Sud, Affari&Finanza of La Repubblica, Avvenire, La Padania, La Stampa, with the monthlies Capital, Avvenimenti, Newton and Max. He held for two years a weekly column on the cultural pages of Il manifesto.

He collaborates with newspapers Il Secolo XIX and Il Sole 24 Ore, weekly newspapers Corriere della Sera SETTE and Panorama, and he has a column on Oggi.
In December 2012 he started a personal blog on Il Fatto Quotidiano.

Books 

 Essays:
 
 
 
 
 Informatics and organization:
 
 
 
 
 
 
 
 
 
 
 
 Law and taxes:
 
 
 
 
 
 
 
 
 
 
 
 
 
 
 
 
 
 
 
 
 
 
 
 
 
 
 
 
 
 
 
 Costume and society
 
 
 
 Divertissement

Awards

References

External links 
 

1959 births
Living people